The United States Figure Skating Hall of Fame serves as a repository for the sport of figure skating. The United States Figure Skating Hall of Fame is where the greatest names in the history of the sport are honored. To be inducted into it is considered the highest achievement an American figure skater can attain. It was founded in 1976. It is located in the World Figure Skating Museum and Hall of Fame, in Colorado Springs, Colorado, United States.

Inductees

All of the 2011 inductees lost their lives in the 1961 crash of Sabena Flight 548, considered to be the most tragic event in figure skating history. They were honored posthumously in observance of the fiftieth anniversary of the tragedy.

External links
U.S. Figure Skating Hall of Fame Members list.

Figure skating organizations
Figure skating in the United States
Figure skating museums and halls of fame
Figure
Sports museums in Colorado
Sports in Colorado Springs, Colorado
Awards established in 1976